Pitys may refer to:

Pitys (mythology), a nymph
Pitys, a genus of land snail;  see Sinployea decorticata